Lindley is a ward of Huddersfield in the metropolitan borough of Kirklees, West Yorkshire, England.   It contains 122 listed buildings that are recorded in the National Heritage List for England.  Of these, four are listed at Grade II*, the middle of the three grades, and the others are at Grade II, the lowest grade.   The ward is to the northwest of the centre of Huddersfield, and includes the districts of Birchencliffe, Lindley, Oakes, Quarmby, and Salendine Nook.  Most of the ward is residential, with some of the northern part being rural.  In the rural part most of the listed buildings are farmhouses and farm buildings, and in the residential part they are houses and associated structures.  The other listed buildings include mill buildings, two guide stones, a boundary stone, a commemorative cross, a public house, churches, chapels and associated structures, and a clock tower.  The clock tower was designed by Edgar Wood, who had family connections with the area, and a number of the listed buildings in the 1890s and 1900s were designed by him.


Key

Buildings

References

Citations

Sources

Lists of listed buildings in West Yorkshire
Buildings and structures in Huddersfield